Gorgopas can refer to:

 Gorgopas (4th century BC), Spartan commander in the Corinthian War
 Gorgopas (2nd century BC), Spartan commander in the Roman-Spartan War
 Gorgopas (butterfly), a skipper butterfly genus